Sui is the transcription of two Chinese surnames,  and .

Notable people

()
Sui Gu, a member of the Heishan bandits in the Eastern Han dynasty
Sui Lu (born 1992), Chinese artistic gymnast
Sui Ran (born 1992), Chinese basketball player

()
Sui Dongliang (born 1977), Chinese football midfielder
Sui Donglu (born 1982), Chinese football defender
Sui Feifei (born 1979), Chinese basketball player
Sui Jianguo (born 1956), Chinese contemporary artist
Sui Jianshuang (born 1989), Chinese rhythmic gymnast
Mike Sui, American comedian
Sui Shengsheng (born 1980), Chinese volleyball player
Sonia Sui (born 1980), Taiwanese actress, television host and model
Sui Xinmei (born 1965), Chinese shot putter 
Sui Wenjing (born 1995), Chinese pair skater
Sui Weijie (born 1983), Chinese football goalkeeper
Sui Yuan (born 1992), Chinese actress
Sui Yunjiang (born 1945), Chinese martial arts master

Chinese-language surnames
Multiple Chinese surnames